The 1999 Wales rugby union tour of Argentina was a series of matches played in May–June 1999 in Argentina by the Wales national team in preparation for the 1999 World Cup.

Results
Complete list of matches played by Wales in Argentina:

Scores and results list Wales's points tally first.

See also
History of rugby union matches between Argentina and Wales

Bibliography

References

1999 rugby union tours
1999
1999 in Argentine rugby union
1999
tour
History of rugby union matches between Argentina and Wales